Set up in 2004, The Documentary New Zealand Trust is a non-profit organisation promoting documentary filmmaking and advocating opportunities for New Zealand documentary filmmakers. Its signature events are an international film festival, DOC Pitch and DOC Lab. It engages with the government, funding agencies, creative organisations, academic institutions and other screen industry guilds to ensure maximum support and funding for documentary filmmakers in New Zealand.

The Organisation

The Trustees

Alex Lee
Dan Shanan

Doc Edge Festival and Awards

The DOCNZ International Documentary Film Festival was launched in 2005 in Auckland by the then Prime Minister, Helen Clark. It was rebranded as Documentary Edge Festival in 2010, then Doc Edge, and is held annually in Auckland and Wellington. 

The Documentary Edge Awards are awarded at the festival.

The Screen Edge Forum 

The Screen Edge Forum (previously known as DOCNZ Summit and Documentary Edge Forum) is an annual pan-screen industry event covering documentary, transmedia and other screen industry topics.

Many Pitch Projects have been developed as a result including: 
The Relocated Mountain, Julia Parnell
The Topp Twins, Arani Cuthbert
Lost in Wonderland, Zoe McIntosh
There Once was an Island: Te Henua E Noho, Briar March
Brother Number One, Annie Goldson
Pictures of Susan, Dan Salmon 
Strawberries with the Führer, Amy O'Connor
Batons & Baquettes, Campbell Cooley
Stumbling into the Wall, Tony Foster
4:20 New Zealand, Arik Reiss
Te Hono Ki Aotearoa - The Waka for Europe, Jan Bieringa
Running for his Life, Anna Cottrell
Varayame's Feet, Sarah Graham Read
Wrestling Spectacular - A Kiwi Century on the Mat, Adam Simpson

DOC Lab

DOC Lab  is a three-day incubator to educate, inspire and develop filmmakers with a shared goal of developing documentaries and exploring multi-platforms for creation and delivery. Local and international experts are brought in as mentors to help the selected projects and teams.

The mentors will present their practice areas and speak on the developments and technologies that will help the selected teams in realizing their projects. They will also work with teams individually and provide feedback, suggestions and development strategies.

Starting from content ideas or from existing material, DOC Lab will discuss new documentary prototypes that use one or more new media. Workshop topics include:

storytelling  including new and different forms of platforms and storytelling devices
collaboration across platforms and genres
how to engage with the community and the role(s) of the audience
interactive and data-based stories
the use of computer games for documentary purposes
funding and commissioning of all media documentaries
new forms of distribution and delivery

Many Projects have been developed as a result including: 
Brother Number One, Annie Goldson 
Finding Mercy, Roby Paterson
PIYN, Gareth Farry, Peter Takapuna
Ringcon, Prue Langbein
Strawberries with the Führer, Amy O'Connor

Documentary Edge Campus 

Documentary Edge Campus  is New Zealand's first resource centre for documentary films and materials. It is available to the wider community for free!

It includes: 
A film library with over 200 titles, books, magazines, and other literature
4 viewing stations
A drop-in centre available for meetings and workshops
Open all year round (excluding weekends and public holidays)

References 

Film organisations in New Zealand